Stegastes apicalis, commonly known as the Japanese gregory, is a damselfish of the family Pomacentridae.

It is native to the northwestern Pacific Ocean in the seas around Japan and the Ryukyu Islands. It has also been reported from Taiwan and South Korea.

References

External links
 
 

altus
Fish described in 1937